Salvador Alfredo Maciá Carbó (Paraná, Entre Ríos Province, Argentina, 17 March 1855 – Buenos Aires, Argentina, 6 January 1929) was a doctor and politician who served as governor of Entre Ríos Province between 1895 and 1899. He also served as a provincial and national deputy, as a national senator. He was a Minister of Government during the government of Sabá Hernández, his predecessor.

His government was known for its nepotism, particularly with regards to Leonidas Echagüe and Enrique Carbó, two relatives of Maciá Carbó who later became governors of the province. Positive elements of Maciá Carbó's government were promotion of trade, agriculture and ranching.

References 

1929 deaths
Governors of Entre Ríos Province
1855 births
People from Paraná, Entre Ríos